Reginald McGregor "Max" Sutherland (April 3, 1904 – February 11, 1984) was a Canadian professional ice hockey player who played two games in the National Hockey League with the Boston Bruins during the 1931–32 season. The rest of his career, which lasted from 1923 to 1939, was spent in various minor leagues. Sutherland was born in Grenfell, Saskatchewan and later served in the Second World War, serving in the Canadian Army, having participated and received injuries to an eye (that was eventually removed) in the Dieppe Raid. In 1944, he was living in Calgary. He died there in 1984 and was buried in the Field of Honour at Mountain View Memorial Gardens.

Career statistics

Regular season and playoffs

References

External links
 

1904 births
1984 deaths
Boston Bruins players
Boston Cubs players
Calgary Tigers players
Canadian ice hockey left wingers
Ice hockey people from Saskatchewan
People from Grenfell, Saskatchewan
Seattle Eskimos players